The Sidney A. Umsted House is a historic house at 404 Washington Street in Camden, Arkansas.  The two story brick house was built in 1923–24, and is one of the best local examples of Mediterranean Revival architecture in the city.  Sidney Umsted, for whom the house was built, became instantly wealthy with the discovery in 1922 of oil in nearby Smackover, and became one of Arkansas' wealthiest men.  The house is faced in beige brick, and features a green tile roof.

The house was listed on the National Register of Historic Places in 1995.  It is now a bed and breakfast inn.

See also
National Register of Historic Places listings in Ouachita County, Arkansas

References

Houses on the National Register of Historic Places in Arkansas
Mission Revival architecture in Arkansas
Houses completed in 1923
Houses in Ouachita County, Arkansas
Individually listed contributing properties to historic districts on the National Register in Arkansas
Buildings and structures in Camden, Arkansas
National Register of Historic Places in Ouachita County, Arkansas
1923 establishments in Arkansas
Spanish Revival architecture in Arkansas
Bed and breakfasts in the United States